Mladen Josić (15 July 1897, Bečej - 1 October 1972, Paris) was a Serbian painter. He had his own atelier in Belgrade where art students came to hone their skills, many becoming renowned academic painters and sculptors.

Biography 
Mladen Josić was born in Bečej on 15 July 1897. His family were from Opovo in Banat. In 1920. he studied in Académie de la Grande Chaumière under Antoine Bourdelle. On return to Yugoslavia architect Dragiša Brašovan builds an atelier for him. Josić paints portraits of king Peter I of Serbia and king Alexander I of Yugoslavia. In 1937. Josić opened his own art school within Ilija M. Kolarac Endowment, from which many artists have emerged, including Mladen Srbinović, Matija Vuković, Stojan Ćelić, Majda Kurnik, Miodrag B. Protić, Zora Petrović and many others. School was closed by Tito's government in 1950. In early 1950s Josić emigrated to France. He lived in Paris until he died in 1972. He is buried with his wife Asja Josić in the Montparnasse Cemetery in Paris. 
His son, Aljoša Josić, was an architect and a painter.

Style 
Josić was influenced originally by Cubism, and later by Realism. Many of his works were inspired by those of the French painters Cézanne and Gauguin.

Works 
 King Peter I of Serbia, portrait, oil on canvas
 King Alexander I of Yugoslavia, portrait, oil on canvas
1953 Dubrovnik Cathedral, oil on canvas, 60 x 80 cm.

See also
 List of painters from Serbia

References 

 Матица српска: Биографије, Том IV

1897 births
1972 deaths
Serbian painters